The 2017 Florida State Seminoles football team represented Florida State University in the sport of American football during the 2017 NCAA Division I FBS football season.  The Seminoles competed in the Atlantic Division of the Atlantic Coast Conference and were led by eighth-year head coach Jimbo Fisher until he left to coach at Texas A&M before the final game of the regular season. They were then coached by interim head coach Odell Haggins. Home games were played at Doak Campbell Stadium in Tallahassee, Florida.

In 2016, the Seminoles won 10 games for the fifth straight season and appeared in the Orange Bowl, a fifth consecutive appearance in a major bowl game. Running back Dalvin Cook, defensive end DeMarcus Walker, offensive tackle Roderick Johnson and cornerback Marquez White went on to be selected in the NFL Draft.

Prior to the start of the season, Deondre Francois, Jacques Patrick, Cam Akers, Nyqwan Murray, Landon Dickerson, and Cole Minshew were named preseason All-ACC offensive selections while Derwin James, Tarvarus McFadden, Derrick Nnadi, Josh Sweat, Brian Burns, and Matthew Thomas were named preseason All-ACC defensive selections. In the pre-season media poll, Florida State was picked to finish first in the ACC Atlantic and win the conference title and Francois was picked as runner-up for ACC Player of the Year while Alec Eberle, McFadden, and James were named to the pre-season All-ACC team.

In the opening game against Alabama, quarterback Deondre Francois suffered a season ending knee injury which resulted in true freshman James Blackman being named the starter for the remainder of the season, leading to the program's worst start since 1976 although the Seminoles went on to become bowl eligible for the 36th consecutive year. Following the game against Florida, Jimbo Fisher resigned as coach; associate coach Odell Haggins was named interim head coach for the remainder of the season.

On December 21, 2017, an unofficial report was published on Reddit claiming that the Seminoles were not bowl eligible due to an NCAA rule stating that for an FCS opponent to be countable towards bowl eligibility, the FCS program must have awarded 90% of the FCS scholarship limit. Delaware State, an FCS team that lost to FSU earlier in the season, did not meet the 90% threshold set by the NCAA. Without this win, FSU stood at 5–6 on the season. However, on December 22, 2017, Florida State addressed the issue and stated that Delaware State verified its scholarship situation as eclipsing the 90-percent threshold. This, FSU claims, is due to an alleged established NCAA rule interpretation, allowing academic and other non-athletic scholarships to count towards the required threshold, however they did not reference the interpreted rule. The confirmation officially gave Florida State bowl eligibility, and allowed the team to play in the Walk-On's Independence Bowl.

Coaching staff

Roster

Rankings

Schedule

Alabama

NC State

Wake Forest

Miami (FL)

Duke

Louisville

Boston College

Syracuse

Clemson

Delaware State

Florida

Louisiana-Monroe

Independence Bowl: Southern Miss

Awards

Watchlists 
 Rimington Trophy
Alec Eberle
 Maxwell Award
Deondre Francois
Derwin James
 Bednarik Award
Derwin James
Matthew Thomas
Derrick Nnadi
Tarvarus McFadden
 John Mackey Award
Ryan Izzo
 Lou Groza Award
Ricky Aguayo
 Outland Trophy
Alex Eberle
Derrick Nnadi
 Nagurski Trophy
Derrick Nnadi
Josh Sweat
Tarvarus McFadden
Derwin James
 Jim Thorpe Award
Derwin James
Tarvarus McFadden
 Paul Hornung Award
Derwin James
 Butkus Award
Jacob Pugh
Matthew Thomas
 Wuerffel Trophy
Alec Eberle
 Davey O'Brien Award
Deondre Francois
 Doak Walker Award
Jacques Patrick
 Manning Award
Deondre Francois
 Ted Hendricks Award
Josh Sweat
Brian Burns
 Senior Bowl
Nate Andrews
Ermon Lane
Trey Marshall
Ro'Derrick Hoskins
Jacob Pugh
Matthew Thomas
Derrick Nnadi

Honors

All-ACC

All-Americans

NFL draft 
Five Seminoles were chosen in the 2018 NFL Draft:

Notes

References 

Florida State
Florida State Seminoles football seasons
Independence Bowl champion seasons
Florida State Seminoles football